The Évian Accords were a set of peace treaties signed on 18 March 1962 in Évian-les-Bains, France, by France and the Provisional Government of the Algerian Republic, the government-in-exile of FLN, which sought Algeria's independence from France. The Accords ended the 1954–1962 Algerian War with a formal cease-fire proclaimed for 19 March and formalized the status of Algeria as an independent nation and the idea of cooperative exchanges between the two countries.

Content of Évian Accords

The Évian Accords consisted of 93 pages of detailed agreements and arrangements. In essence these covered cease-fire arrangements, prisoner releases, the recognition of full sovereignty and right to self-determination of Algeria, in addition to guarantees of protection, non-discrimination and property rights for all Algerian citizens. A section dealing with military issues provided for the withdrawal of French forces over a period of two years, with the exception of those garrisoning the French military base of Mers El Kébir. Other provisions pledged that there would be no sanctions for any acts committed prior to the ceasefire.

French President Charles de Gaulle wanted to maintain French interests in the area, including industrial and commercial primacy and control over Saharan oil reserves.  In addition, the European French community (the colon population), the pieds-noirs and indigenous Sephardi Jews in Algeria were guaranteed religious freedom and property rights as well as French citizenship with the option to choose between French and Algerian citizenship after three years.  In exchange, Algeria received access to technical assistance and financial aid from the French government.  Algerians were permitted to continue freely circulating between their country and France for work, although they would not have political rights equal to French citizens. The OAS right-wing movement opposed the negotiations through a series of bombings and an assassination attempt against De Gaulle at Clamart in Paris in August 1962.

The agreements included an article which stated that "Algeria concedes to France the use of certain air bases, terrains, sites and military installations which are necessary to it." The agreement specifically permitted France to maintain its naval base at Mers El Kébir for another fifteen years and facilities for underground nuclear testing in the Sahara; France withdrew from the base in 1967, only five years after the agreement.

The vote
In a referendum held on 8 April 1962, the French electorate approved the Accords, with almost 91% in favour.  The final result was 17,866,423 in favour of Algerian independence, and 1,809,074 against.

On 1 July, the Accords were subject to a second referendum in Algeria, where with 5,975,581 voted for independence and just 16,534 against. De Gaulle pronounced Algeria an independent country on 3 July.

The negotiators

Outcome of Agreements
The historian Alistair Horne comments that most provisions of the agreements were to be overtaken by events.<ref>Alistair Horne, page 521 A Savage War of Peace: Algeria 1954-1962', '</ref> The wholesale exodus of almost all of the million-strong European community immediately prior to independence made the three year transition clauses a dead letter, while the widespread killings of Muslims who had served as auxiliaries (harkis) with the French Army was in direct contravention of the amnesty provisions of the treaty.

See also
 Fifth French Republic
 France in the twentieth century

References

Bibliography
Adler, Stephen. International Migration and Dependence. Gower Publishing Company, Ltd. (Hampshire: 1977).
Barkaoui, Miloud. "Kennedy and the Cold War imbroglio - the case of Algeria's independence." Arab Studies Quarterly.  Spring 1999.
Horne, Alistair A Savage War of Peace: Algeria 1954-1962'

Algerian War
Contemporary French history
1962 in France
Algeria–France relations
Treaties of France
Treaties of French Algeria
Treaties concluded in 1962
Treaties entered into force in 1962
1962 in Algeria
Ceasefires